William Thomas Councilman (January 1, 1854 in Pikesville, Maryland – May 26, 1933 in York Village, Maine) was an American pathologist.

He is remembered for his contribution in a monograph on amoebic dysentery (1891) which described detailed observations of it and its parasite.  He is even better known for his work on Yellow Fever. William Thomas Councilman served as the first pathologist-in-chief at Peter Bent Brigham Hospital (PBBH).  Councilman had arrived in Harvard Medical School earlier in 1892 and was an expert in the study of amebiasis, diphtheria, smallpox, and yellow fever.  His vivid morphologic description of changes seen in the liver of yellow fever lives on today as "Councilman body".

In 1916, he went with the Rice Expedition, led by Alexander H. Rice, Jr., to the Amazon and Brazil. With Robert Archibald Lambert, he wrote a report and book on the expedition which was published in 1918.

By invitation, two years after his retirement at Harvard, he temporarily joined the staff of the Peking Union Medical College in China.

A gifted horticulturist, Councilman always found time to care for his beautiful garden outside his office.

Selected works 
 Councilman, W.T., Disease And Its Causes, New York : Henry Holt and Company, 1913
 Councilman, W.T. and R.A. Lambert. The Medical Report of the Rice Expedition to Brazil, Cambridge: Harvard University Press, 1918

See also
 Pathology
 List of pathologists

References

External links 
 
 
 National Academy of Sciences Biographical Memoir

American pathologists
1854 births
1933 deaths
People from Pikesville, Maryland